Gregory Inman Mathews (born May 17, 1962), is a retired professional baseball pitcher. He played all or parts of five seasons in Major League Baseball between 1986 and 1992 for the St. Louis Cardinals and the Philadelphia Phillies.

Mathews is an alumnus of Savanna High School in Anaheim, California, and of California State University, Fullerton. He played summer collegiate baseball for the Hazlet Elks of the Saskatchewan Major Baseball League in 1986 prior to playing in the majors. During his rookie year Greg put up a 3.65 ERA in 145.1 innings.  His 11 wins in 1986 were the most by a Cardinal rookie since Brooks Lawrence had 15 in 1954; Luis Arroyo also had 11 wins as a rookie in 1955.  His best year is most likely 1987, when he posted a 3.73 ERA, won 11 games and struck out 108 batters. 

He currently lives in Buena Park, California.

References

External links
, or Retrosheet, or Pura Pelota (Venezuelan Winter League)

1962 births
Living people
Arkansas Travelers players
Baseball players from Los Angeles
Beloit Brewers players
Cal State Fullerton Titans baseball players
California State University, Fullerton alumni
Denver Zephyrs players
El Paso Diablos players
Erie Cardinals players
Johnson City Cardinals players
Louisville Redbirds players
Major League Baseball pitchers
Philadelphia Phillies players
Santa Ana Dons baseball players
Savannah Cardinals players
Scranton/Wilkes-Barre Red Barons players
St. Louis Cardinals players
St. Petersburg Cardinals players
Tigres de Aragua players
American expatriate baseball players in Venezuela
Webster University alumni
People from Harbor City, Los Angeles